The citrangequat is a citrus hybrid of a citrange and a kumquat, developed by Walter Swingle at Eustis, Florida, in 1909.  Citrangequats are bitter in taste, but are considered edible by some at the peak of their maturity. Three named cultivars exist:
'Sinton' – Nagami kumquat (Fortunella margarita) x Rusk citrange; named for the city of Sinton, Texas
'Telfair' – Nagami kumquat x Willits citrange; named for Telfair County, Georgia
'Thomasville' – most common citrangequat; named for the city of Thomasville, Georgia. 'Thomasville' is considered the most cold-hardy edible citrus variety. It can tolerate temperatures down to −15 °C (5 °F).

References

Oranges (fruit)
Citrus hybrids
Food and drink introduced in 1909
Kumquats